The Värmland Regiment, designations I 22, I 2 and I 2/Fo 52, was a Swedish Army infantry regiment that traces its origins back to the 16th century. The regiment's soldiers were originally recruited from the province of Värmland, where the unit was later garrisoned. The unit was disbanded as a result of the disarmament policies set forward in the Defence Act of 2000.

History 

The regiment has its origins in fänikor (companies) raised in Värmland in the 16th century. These units—along with fänikor from the nearby province of Närke—were organised into Närke-Värmland Regiment, which was split into two new regiments in 1812, one being Värmland Regiment, the other being Närke Regiment. The regiment was given the designation I 22 (22nd Infantry Regiment) in a general order in 1816. The designation was changed to I 2 (2nd Infantry Regiment) in 1939. In 1973, the regiment gained the new designation I 2/Fo 52 as a consequence of a merge with the local defence district Fo 52. Värmland Regiment was garrisoned in Karlstad from 1913 moved to Kristinehamn in 1994 before being disbanded in 2000.

Campaigns 

The Campaign against Norway (1814)

Organisation 

1812
Livkompaniet
Kils kompani
Jösse kompani
Älvdals kompani
Grums kompani
Nordmarks kompani
Näs kompani
Gillbergs kompani

Heraldry and traditions

Colours, standards and guidons
After the regiment was raised in 1812, it was presented with on life colour and five battalion colours of the 1814 model. On 12 July 1849, the regiment was presented with two new colours for the 1st Battalion and the 2nd Battalion. The presenting was made by King Oscar I. In 1913 the colour was restored and one more battle honour was added. A new colour was presented to the regiment at the Artillery Yard in Stockholm by the commanding officer of the Middle Military District, major general Kjell Koserius on 13 May 2000. It was used as regimental colour by I 2/Fo 52 until 1 July 2000. From 1994, the colour was carried by both the regiment and the brigade. From 1 July 2000, the colour was carried by the Värmland Group (Värmlandsgruppen), and from 1 July 2005 by the Örebro-Värmland Group ( Örebro-Värmlandsgruppen).

The colour is drawn by Kristina Holmgård-Åkerberg and embroidered by machine in insertion technique by the company Libraria. Blazon: "On yellow cloth the provincial badge of Värmland; a black eagle, wings elevated and displayed, armed red. On a black border at the upper side of the colour, battle honours Fredriksodde 1657, Tåget över Bält 1658, Lund 1677, Landskrona 1678, Narva 1700, Düna 1701, Kliszow 1702, Fraustadt 1706, Malatitze 1708, Gadebusch 1712 in yellow".

Coat of arms
The coat of the arms of the Värmland Regiment (I 2/Fo 52) 1977–1994 and the Värmland Brigade (IB 2) 1994–2000. Blazon: "Argent, the provincial badge of Värmland, an eagle azure, wings elevated and displayed, armed and langued gules. The shield surmounted two muskets in saltire, or". The coat of the arms of the Värmland Regiment (I 2/Fo 52) 1994–2000 and the Värmland Group (Värmlandsgruppen) 2000–2004. Blazon: "Argent, the provincial badge of Värmland, an eagle wings elevated and displayed azure, armed and langued gules. The shield surmounted two swords in saltire, or".

Medals
The medal ribbon divided in yellow and black moiré.

The medal ribbon is of yellow moiré with broad black edges and two thinly placed red stripes on the middle. An eagle of gold is attached to the ribbon.

Commanding officers
Regimental commanders active at the regiment during the years 1812–2000.

Commanders

1812–1840: Carl Cederström
1840–1856: O A Malmborg
1856–1859: O A Brunecrona
1859–1864: J H Rosensvärd
1864–1877: A L T Wijkander
1877–1881: J H Lemke
1881–1892: Helmer Falk
1892–1900: Ernst August Winroth
1901–1911: Colonel Carl Otto Nordensvan
1911–1917: Arvid Emil Uggla
1918–1927: Axel Gustaf Adolf Leijonhufvud
1928–1935: Claës Axel Klingenstierna
1935–1939: Thord Rickard Evers
1939–1951: Fredrik Grevillius
1951–1953: Colonel Regner Leuhusen
1953–1961: Sven Holmberg
1961–1969: Carl Gustav Henrik Gideon Linnell
1969–1980: Senior colonel Per Sune Wallin
1980–1989: Senior colonel Ulf Ling-Vannérus
1989–1994: Dan Albin Snell
1994–2000: Yngve Johansson
2000–2000: Björn Tomtlund

Deputy commanders
1979–1980: Colonel Krister Larsson (acting)
1980–1980: Colonel Ulf Ling-Vannerus
1980–1981: Colonel Lennart Frick
1981–1983: Colonel Ingvar Rittsél

Names, designations and locations

See also
List of Swedish infantry regiments

Footnotes

References

Notes

Print

Further reading

Infantry regiments of the Swedish Army
Disbanded units and formations of Sweden
Military units and formations established in 1812
Military units and formations disestablished in 2000
1812 establishments in Sweden
2000 disestablishments in Sweden
Karlstad Garrison